The British in Italy are a migrant community of 66,912 people in 2020, mainly present in Rome, Milan and Tuscany.

Foreigners holding British citizenship number 30,325

History

See also  
 Italy–United Kingdom relations
 Italians in the United Kingdom

External links 

 L’effetto Brexit nel nostro Paese colpisce quasi mille imprese e 30mila inglesi (in Italian), on Il Sole 24 Ore

References 
 

European diaspora in Italy
Ethnic groups in Italy
British diaspora in Italy